Philip Fotheringham-Parker (22 September 1907 – 15 October 1981) was a racing driver from England.  He was born in Beckenham, Kent.

Fotheringham-Parker participated in the 1951 British Grand Prix, driving a privately run Maserati 4CL, but retired from the race after a problem with an oil pipe, scoring no championship points.  Later that year, he won the 1951 Scottish Grand Prix, a minor Formula One race at Winfield with this car.

Fotheringham-Parker competed in the 1953 24 Hours of Le Mans race, sharing an Allard with Sidney Allard himself, but the team retired after completing just four laps.  He also took part in the 1954 Monte Carlo Rally with a Ford Zephyr.

He died in Beckley, East Sussex, aged 74.

Complete Formula One World Championship results
(key)

1907 births
1981 deaths
English racing drivers
English Formula One drivers
24 Hours of Le Mans drivers
People from Beckenham
World Sportscar Championship drivers
People from Beckley, East Sussex